Maruta may refer to:

 Cătălin Măruță (born 1978), Romanian TV host
 Hinata Maruta (born 1997), Japanese boxer
 Maruta Gardner (1947–2016), American community activist and public school administrator
 A grindcore/death metal band that includes drummer Nick Augusto
 A program of experimentation on human beings at the Imperial Japanese Army's Unit 731

See also
 Marut (disambiguation)
 Marutas
 Maruti (disambiguation)